The Rights of All (May 1829 to 1830) was an African-American abolitionist newspaper, founded in New York City by Samuel Cornish, a black Presbyterian minister and antislavery activist. The Rights of All replaced Freedom's Journal, the nation's first African-American newspaper, which had been founded by Cornish together with John Russwurm. Cornish had resigned from Freedom's Journal after six months, and under Russwurm's sole editorship, it reversed its opposition to the American Colonization Society to become a pro-colonizationist organ, running along these lines until Russwurm moved to Liberia in late 1829.  In launching The Rights of All, Cornish reemphasized the opposition to the American Colonization Society that had been a signature theme of the early months of Freedom's Journal. Yet there was a great deal of continuity between the two publications, and The Rights of All deployed the same subscription agents, including radical abolitionist David Walker, who promoted the publication in his Appeal to the Coloured Citizens of the World. Cornish estimated that The Rights of All had about 800 subscribers, but despite this robust support, the journal survived less than a year.

References 

 David E. Swift, Black Prophets of Justice: Activist Clergy Before the Civil War (1989)
 Jacqueline Bacon, Freedom's Journal: The First African American Newspaper (2007)
 Winston James, The Struggles of John Russwurm Brown: The Life and Writings of a Pan-Africanist Pioneer, 1799–1851 (2010)

Abolitionist newspapers published in the United States
Defunct newspapers published in New York City
Newspapers established in 1829
Publications disestablished in 1830
Defunct African-American newspapers
African-American newspapers published in New York (state)
1829 establishments in New York (state)
1830 disestablishments in New York (state)